Michelle Kit Ying Chan (born 19 May 1987) is a New Zealand female badminton player.

Achievements

Oceania Championships
Women's singles

Women's doubles

BWF International Challenge/Series
Women's singles

Women's doubles

  BWF International Challenge tournament
  BWF International Series tournament
  BWF Future Series tournament

References

External links 
 
 
 
 
 

Living people
1987 births
Hong Kong people
New Zealand female badminton players
Commonwealth Games competitors for New Zealand
Badminton players at the 2014 Commonwealth Games
Badminton players at the 2010 Commonwealth Games